Ardea is an ancient town and comune in the Metropolitan City of Rome,  south of Rome and about  from today's Mediterranean coast.

The economy is mostly based on agriculture, although, starting from the 1970s, industry has played an increasingly important role.

History
Ardea is one of the most ancient towns in western Europe, founded during the 8th century BC. According to tradition it was the capital of the Rutuli, and it is described as such in the Aeneid.

In 509 BC Lucius Tarquinius Superbus, the king of Rome, sought unsuccessfully to take the town by storm, and then commenced a siege of the town. However, the siege was interrupted by the revolution which resulted in the overthrow of the king and the establishment of the Roman republic.  One of the leaders of the revolution, Lucius Junius Brutus, came to the camp of the Roman army at Ardea and won the army's support for the revolution.

In 443 BC the Volscians laid siege to Ardea. The siege was soon broken by Roman troops under the leadership of Marcus Geganius Macerinus.

After the Roman conquest, Ardea was most often mentioned in connection with the Via Ardeatina, one of the consular roads, to which it gave its name.

During the Second Punic War, it was one of the few cities that refused military support to Rome, and, after the Roman victory, was deprived of its autonomy. In the 3rd–2nd centuries BC it decayed until, in the Imperial Age, it was scarcely populated at all. The 1st century agricultural writer Columella possessed estates there.

After the fall of the Western Roman Empire, Ardea was abandoned. It returned to grow only after the 9th century AD. Its castle in 1118 housed Pope Gelasius II and was later contended among various feudal barons of the area. In 1419 Pope Martin V assigned it to his kinsmen, the Colonna family, who sold it in 1564 to the Cesarini.

In 1816 it became a frazione of Genzano. Starting from 1932, the surrounding area was drained and Ardea began to flourish again, becoming a frazione of Pomezia starting from its foundation around 1948 and an independent municipality in 1970.

Main sights
Remains of the ancient city include the old defensive agger, dating to the 7th century BC and later (4th century BC) updated to larger walls. Archaeological excavations have brought to light four temples, of unknown dedication. Part of the pavement of a basilica (c. 100 BC) have also been found in the area of the ancient Forum.
Other sights include:
The Church of Santa Marina, erected in 1191 by Cencio Savelli, the future Pope Honorius III. The interior, on a single nave, was originally entirely frescoed.
Romanesque Church of San Pietro Apostolo (12th century), which was a possession of the monks of San Paolo Fuori le Mura of Rome. It incorporates a former watchtower used to counter Saracen attacks, now turned into a bell tower. It has 15th-century frescoes and a 16th-century wooden crucifix.
The Giardini della Landriana, designed by Russell Page.
Giacomo Manzù Museum, housing some 400 works of the artist.
Tor San Lorenzo, a tower in the eponymous seaside frazione. It was rebuilt in 1570 after a design by Michelangelo, in the area of a former Palaeo-Christian church devoted to St. Lawrence.

International relations

Ardea is twinned with:
 Argos, Greece
 Rielasingen-Worblingen, Germany

References

Sources
Livy, Ab urbe condita 4.9

External links

Official website

Ardea, Lazio